Sujuk or sucuk is a dry, spicy and fermented sausage which is consumed in several Balkan, Middle Eastern and Central Asian cuisines. Sujuk mainly consists of ground meat and animal fat usually obtained from beef or lamb, but beef is mainly used in Turkey, Armenia,  Bulgaria, Kazakhstan and Kyrgyzstan.

Etymology and terminology
Sucuk was first mentioned in the 11th century by Mahmud al-Kashgari in his Dīwān Lughāt al-Turk as suɣut. Another mention was made by Abu Hayyan al-Gharnati in his early 14th century work titled Kitab al-'idrak li-lisan al-'atrak (كتاب الإدراك للسان الأتراك). It possibly evolved from a Middle Iranian word attested in Early New Persian as zīç (زيچ) and ziwīdj (زویج) (meaning "stretching, strip, cord" and "sausage" respectively) which later took the form of zīçak (زیچک), while a Turkic origin has also been proposed. Cognate names are also present in other Turkic languages, e.g. Franciscus a Mesgnien Meninski in his Thesaurus recorded the word sucuk (سجوق) for the first time in Ottoman Turkish in late 17th century.

The Turkish name  has been adopted largely unmodified by other languages in the region, including ; ; ; ; ; ; ; ; ; ; ; ; .

Production
In Turkey, beef is the main raw material for sucuk production. At the beginning of the process the meat is preground in  plates and tested for its fat content. Later the preground meat is mixed with frozen and ground tail fat, beef tallow, suet and additives like spices, ascorbate, dextrose and starter culture. The mixture is ground again in  plates, which forms the mosaic structure of sucuk. Thenceforth the product is filled in casings made of collagen or fiber and these casings are twisted or tied to portionize sucuk.

Sucuk is then prepared for ripening process, which consists of fermentation and post-fermentation stages. At the end of the stage pH of the product must be dropped to 4.9–5.0. In the post-fermentation stage sucuk is matured and dried until the moisture content of the sausage is under 40%.

Nutrition 
It was reported that sucuk from Turkey on average contained 24.5% protein, 31.5% fat, 35.65% moisture and 3.80% salt. Fat content of sucuk is highly variable; some sucuk brands tested contained only 23% fat, meanwhile others exceeded 42%.

Dishes prepared with sujuk
Thin slices of sujuk can be pan-fried in a bit of butter, while larger pieces may be grilled. Sucuklu yumurta, which literally means "eggs with sujuk", is commonly served as a Turkish breakfast dish. Sucuklu yumurta is a simple dish of fried eggs cooked together with sujuk, but sujuk may also be added to other egg dishes like menemen (which is similar to shakshouka but with scrambled eggs instead of poached).

Sujuk can be added to many dishes including bean stew (kuru fasulye), filled phyllo dough pastries (burek) and as a topping for pizza or pide.

See also
 Qazı
 Lukanka
 , a horsemeat sausage
 Soutzoukakia, spicy meatballs in sauce whose name means literally "little sucuk"
 Salami
 Bresaola

References

Appetizers
Fermented sausages
Albanian cuisine
Armenian cuisine
Azerbaijani cuisine
Balkan cuisine
Bosnia and Herzegovina cuisine
Bulgarian sausages
Bulgarian cuisine
Caucasian cuisine
Central Asian cuisine
Croatian cuisine
Cuisine of Georgia (country)
Greek cuisine
Iraqi cuisine
Kazakhstani cuisine
Kosovan cuisine
Kurdish cuisine
Romanian cuisine
Serbian cuisine
Kyrgyz cuisine
Macedonian cuisine
Middle Eastern cuisine
Ottoman cuisine
Turkish cuisine